Adams County lies in northeastern Indiana in the United States and shares its eastern border with Ohio. It was officially established in 1836. The county seat is Decatur.

According to the 2020 census, its population was 35,809, an increase of 4.1% from 34,387 in 2010. The county has four incorporated cities and towns with a total population of over 15,000, as well as many small unincorporated communities. The county is divided into 12 townships which provide local services. There are four Indiana state roads in the county, as well as three U.S. Routes and one railroad line.

In 2017, about a quarter of the county's population (estimated 8,600) was Swiss Amish that settled in the Southern half of the county around Berne.

History
The statute that mandated creation of this county was passed on February 7, 1835, and the organization itself was authorized on March 1, 1836. Its name honors the sixth President of the United States, John Quincy Adams. Selection of the county seat was finalized on 18 May of that year.

The first non-Native settlers arrived in what is now Adams County in 1835, encouraged by the new Erie Canal and by the end of the Black Hawk War. They consisted entirely of settlers from New England. These were "Yankee" settlers, that is to say they were descended from the English Puritans who settled New England in the colonial era. They were primarily members of the Congregational Church although due to the Second Great Awakening many of them had converted to Methodism and some had become Baptists before coming to what is now Adams County. The Congregational Church subsequently has gone through many divisions and some factions are now known as the Church of Christ and the United Church of Christ. When these settlers arrived they found dense forest and wild prairie.

The first Amish settlers arrived in 1840; most came directly from Switzerland, preserving their Bernese German dialect, not adopting the Pennsylvania Dutch dialect of the majority of the Amish.

The Yankee settlers commissioned the first courthouse in 1839, a two-story frame building. The log-building jail was completed in 1837. The present Adams County courthouse was built in Decatur in 1872–1873 at a cost of $78,979. The designer was J. C. Johnson, who had been trained as a carpenter and joiner and became a self-taught architect; he won second place in the Indiana State Capitol design competition. The construction was done by Christian Boseker of Fort Wayne. It is built of red brick with stone ornamentation.

Geography

Adjacent counties
 Allen County (north)
 Van Wert County, Ohio (northeast)
 Mercer County, Ohio (southeast)
 Jay County (south)
 Wells County (west)

The county has four incorporated settlements, all of which lie in a rough north–south line.  The city of Decatur is the largest and is also the county seat, and is in the northern part of the county where U.S. Route 27 and U.S. Route 33 intersect with the east–west U.S. Route 224.  U.S. Route 27 continues south through the town of Monroe, near the center of the county, and then on through Berne and Geneva.

Communities

Cities

 Berne
 Decatur
 Geneva
 Monroe

Unincorporated communities

 Ceylon
 Coppess Corner
 Curryville
 Honduras
 Linn Grove
 Magley
 Monmouth
 Perryville
 Peterson
 Pleasant Mills
 Preble
 Rivare
 Salem
 Williams

Townships

 Blue Creek
 French
 Hartford
 Jefferson
 Kirkland
 Monroe
 Preble
 Root
 Saint Marys
 Union
 Wabash
 Washington

Climate and weather

Adams County is in the humid continental climate region of the United States along with most of Indiana. Its Köppen climate classification is Dfa, meaning that it is cold, has no dry season, and has a hot summer.

Demographics

As of the 2020 United States Census, there were 35,809 people, and 12,481 households in the county.

In 2000 the racial makeup of the county was 97.8% white, 0.6% black or African American, 0.4% Asian, 0.3% American Indian or Alaska Native, and 0.9% from two or more races. Those of Hispanic or Latino origin made up 4.5% of the population. In terms of ancestry, 30.3% were German, 5.6% were Irish, 4.1% were English, and 2.7% were French (not Basque). Additionally, 11.5% of the population has a visible or non-visible disability. 

Of the 12,481 households, 31.3% had children under the age of 18 living with them, 55.1% were married couples living together and 24% had a female householder with no spouse present. The average household size was 2.79 and the average family size was 3.39. The median age was 33.5 years. Of the total population, 77.1% own homes and 8.7% are renters.

Regarding educational attainment, 40.6% of the population has a high school degree or higher, with 15.5% having a bachelor's degree or higher. Manufacturing employees the most employed residents at 31.2%, followed by 17.6% in education, health care and social services, and 10.3% in retail.

The median income for a household in the county was $52,504 and the median income for a family was $65,609. The per capita income for the county was $23,316. About 16.8% of the population were below the poverty line, including 24.5% of those under age 18 and 6.5% of those age 65 or over.

2020 census

Amish community
The Amish community in Adams County belongs the Swiss Amish, which is an Amish affiliation whose ancestors came to Adam County in 1840 and who speak a Bernese dialect in everyday life. They had a total population of 8,595 people in 58 congregations in 2017, or 24.2% of the county's population.

Transportation
Three U.S Routes cross the county. U.S. Route 27 and U.S. Route 33 enter the north end of the county from Fort Wayne in neighboring Allen County. Passing through Decatur, they split; U.S. Route 27 goes south through Monroe, Berne and Geneva and continues into Jay County, whereas U.S. Route 33 heads southeast into Ohio. U.S. Route 224 passes from west to east through the north part of the county, intersecting U.S. Routes 27 and 33 in Decatur, then continuing into Ohio.

Indiana State Road 124 runs east–west through the county, from Bluffton in Wells County through Monroe and on to the Ohio border. Indiana State Road 101 runs south–north, from State Road 124 near the Ohio border, through Pleasant Mills and Rivare, to Allen County. Indiana State Road 116 runs west–east across the county, from Bluffton southeast to Linn Grove, south to Perryville, then east to a terminus at U.S. Route 27 in Geneva. Indiana State Road 218 runs west–east across the southern end of the county, passing through Berne.

CSX Transportation operates a rail line from Decatur, running northwest toward Fort Wayne.

Government

The county government is a constitutional body granted specific powers by the Constitution of Indiana and the Indiana Code. The county council is the legislative branch of the county government and controls all spending and revenue collection. Representatives are elected from county districts. The council members serve four-year terms and are responsible for setting salaries, the annual budget and special spending. The council also has limited authority to impose local taxes, in the form of an income and property tax that is subject to state level approval, excise taxes and service taxes. In 2010, the county budgeted approximately $2.2 million for the district's schools and $2.8 million for other county operations and services, for a total annual budget of approximately $5 million.

A Board of Commissioners forms the county's executive body. They are elected county-wide, in staggered four–year terms. One commissioner serves as Board President. This board executes the acts of the council, causes necessary revenues to be collected, and manages day-to-day functions of the county government.

The county maintains a small claims court. This court's judge is elected to a term of four years and must be a member of the Indiana Bar Association. The judge is assisted by a constable who is elected to a four-year term. In some cases, court decisions can be appealed to the state level circuit court.

The county has other elected offices, including sheriff, coroner, auditor, treasurer, recorder, surveyor and circuit court clerk. Each of these serves a term of four years and oversees a different part of county government. Members elected to county government positions are required to declare party affiliations and be residents of the county.

Each township has a trustee who administers rural fire protection and ambulance service, provides poor relief, and manages cemetery care. The trustee is assisted by a three-member township board. The trustees and board members are elected to four-year terms.

Adams County is part of Indiana's 3rd congressional district; Indiana Senate district 19; and Indiana House of Representatives district 79.

Politically, Adams County is heavily Republican. It has voted for the Republican presidential nominee in all but one election since 1940.

Education
Public schools in Adams County are administered by three public entities: North Adams Community Schools; Adams Central Community Schools; and South Adams Schools. The Diocese of Fort Wayne and Lutheran Schools of Indiana both operate in Adams County as well. In all, these organizations operate 13 schools in the county.

Festivals and Fairs in Adams County
 Adams County 4-H Fair (Monroe)
 Swiss Days (Berne)
 Calithumpian Festival (Decatur)
 Festival of Kekionga (Decatur)
 4th of July Fireworks, (Down Town Decatur)
 Summer Concert Series (Downtown Decatur)
 DeKeggar BBQ and Beer Brewing Competition (Downtown Decatur)
 Highland Games - Old Scottish Style Strength Competition (Downtown Decatur)

Media

Radio
 WZBD (Berne)

Newspapers
 The Decatur Daily Democrat (Decatur)
 Berne Tri-Weekly (Berne)

Notable people
 Gene Stratton-Porter (1863 – 1924), author, nature photographer, naturalist, and silent movie-era producer, lived in Decatur and Geneva 1886–1913.
 Chemist Richard R. Schrock, 2005 Nobel Prize winner in organic chemistry, was born in Berne in 1945 and attended school in Decatur.
 Director David Anspaugh (born 1946), who directed the movies Hoosiers and Rudy, was born in Decatur.
 Sculptor David Smith (1906 – 1965) was born in Decatur.

See also
 List of public art in Adams County
 National Register of Historic Places listings in Adams County, Indiana

Notes

References

Bibliography

External links
 Adams County website
 Maumee Valley Heritage Corridor
 Adams County InDepth Profile: STATS Indiana 
 County Highlights: Adams County: Hoosiers by the Numbers

 
Indiana counties
1836 establishments in Indiana
Populated places established in 1836
Fort Wayne, IN Metropolitan Statistical Area
Sundown towns in Indiana